The Montmartre Synagogue is situated on the Rue Sainte-Isaure, in the 18th arrondissement of Paris.

Since 1904 a small Jewish temple has been functioning at this location. In 1907, baron Edmond de Rothschild contributed to its expansion.

During the Second World War, in 1941 the synagogue was damaged by far-right French collaborators..

Literature 
 Michel Meslin. Paris et ses religions au XXe siècle : actes du colloque du 6 novembre 1990. Volume 2 Cahiers d'anthropologie religieuse, . Presses Paris Sorbonne, 1993.  .
 Cécile Desprairies, Paris dans la Collaboration, préface de Serge Klarsfeld, éditions du Seuil, Paris,  2009 .
 Dominique Jarassé, Guide du patrimoine juif parisien, Parigramme, 2003.

References

External links

Montmartre
Buildings and structures in the 18th arrondissement of Paris
Synagogues completed in 1939
Montmartre
Orthodox synagogues in France
Sephardi Jewish culture in France
Sephardi synagogues